St Magdalene's Hill is a hill located  south-southwest of Perth, Scotland, next to the M90 motorway.

The hill (and woodland, which is shown on a 1783 military survey map) takes its name from St Mary Magdalene's hospital for the poor, which was located near the site.

References

Landforms of Perth, Scotland
Mountains and hills of Perth and Kinross